T.Love is a Polish rock band formed in 1982, originally known as Teenage Love Alternative, by Zygmunt "Muniek" Staszczyk, Janusz Konorowski, Dariusz Zając and Jacek Wudecki, all friends from high school in Częstochowa.

The band changed their name to T.Love in December 1987.

Members

Current line-up

Zygmunt Staszczyk – vocals (1982–present), bass guitar (1982–1983)
Maciej Majchrzak – guitars (1994–present)
Jan Pęczak – guitars (2007–present)
Paweł Nazimek – bass guitar (1991–present)
Sidney Polak – drums (1990–present)
Michał Marecki – keyboards (2005–present)

Former members
Janusz Knorowski – guitars (1982–1985)
Wojciech Wierus – guitars (1983–1984)
Andrzej Zeńczewski – guitars (1984–1989)
Rafał Włoczewski – guitars (1986–1989)
Jarosław Kowalski – guitars (1986)
Jan Benedek – guitars (1990–1994)
Krzysztof Szymański – guitars (1990–1991)
Krzysztof Zawadka – guitars (1991–1992)
Jacek "Perkoz" Perkowski – guitars (1992–2006)
Jacek Śliwczyński – bass guitar (1983–1989)
Przemysław Wójcicki – bass guitar (1990)
Tomasz "Wolfgang" Grochowalski – bass guitar (1991)
Jacek Wudecki – drums (1982–1987)
Piotr Wysocki – drums (1987–1989)
Robert Szambelan – drums (1989–1990)
Darek Zając – keyboards (1982–1989)
Romuald Kunikowski – keyboards (1991–1994)
Jarosław Woszczyna – saxophone (1982–1983)
Henryk Wosążnik – saxophone (1983)
Piotr Malak – saxophone (1984–1985)
Tom Pierzchalski – saxophone (1985–1989)

Discography

Studio albums

Live albums

Video albums

References

External links

 Official T.Love site 

Polish rock music groups
Musical groups established in 1982
Living people
1982 establishments in Poland
Culture in Częstochowa
Year of birth missing (living people)